Anna Ludmilla (January 12, 1903, Chicago – April 18, 1990, Houston), born Jean Marie Kaley, was a ballet dancer based in Chicago, New York City, and then France. She toured widely before injuring her leg in 1930 and after that focused on ballroom dancing and teaching. During her career, she performed for the Chicago Opera Ballet in the Chicago Opera Association, later known as Chicago Civic Opera Company, on Broadway in New York City, and in film. As a teacher she moved with her husband to Panama where she headed the ballet division of a new National School of Dance.

Early life

Ludmilla was born in the Englewood suburb of Chicago and at age five began studying dance with Mabel Wentworth. Jean, as she was then known, had two ballerina idols, Adeline Geneé and Anna Pavlova, but it was Pavlova who inspired her the most. During her eighth grade year of public school, in 1915, Jean got a chance not only to see Pavlova and her Imperial Russian Ballet perform, but to meet her idol. The company performed at night, while during the day Pavlova was starring in a movie being filmed near Midway Gardens theatre, and Mabel Wentworth was granted permission to introduce a few of her students to the internationally renown ballerina. It was an experience Jean would never forget. From then on the aspiring ballerina began collecting photographs of Pavlova. When she heard about a new dance school in Chicago, founded by two of Pavlova's former male danseurs, Jean left Mabel Wentworth's school to begin taking lessons from Serge Oukrainsky and Andreas Pavley. She auditioned for their newly organized company. By 1916, at age thirteen, Jean was the principal ballerina in America's first internationally touring ballet company, the Oukrainsky-Pavley Ballet. Because Serge Oukrainsky, a Russian, and Pavley, a Dane, believed it in their company's interest (for publicity and to increase ticket sales) to promote Jean as a Russian-trained, rather than an American-trained, ballerina, they changed her name to Anna Ludmilla (often spelled Anna Ludmila and, occasionally, Ana Ludmilla). The company toured the U.S., performing in urban cities in states such as Nebraska, Missouri, Wisconsin and Massachusetts. Ludmilla dropped out of high school to pursue her career as a professional dancer; a career choice her mother supported but her father and grandmother opposed. Her unconventional career path as a ballerina in the early 1900s, and her Russianized name, would cause an estrangement with her father. In 1917, she had her New York City debut at Carnegie Hall with the New York Symphony where she met Walter Damrosch. Theatre Magazine would name Ludmilla the American Pavlova.

When Pavley and Oukrainsky were hired by Maestro Cleofonte Campanini as principal soloists in Chicago Opera Association productions, this led to some of their ballet company members being hired to dance in operatic ballet numbers, also, including Ludmilla. Thus, in addition to performing in the Oukrainsky-Pavley Ballet, she performed with the Chicago Opera Ballet in the Chicago Opera Association, later known as Chicago Civic Opera Company. The Chicago Opera Ballet had three functions: to provide well-trained dancers for the opera productions; to entertain the audience between acts; and, because opera productions, and theaters housing opera companies, were expensive to operate, to bring in additional revenue by offering a few dance-only performances each year. Ludmilla was introduced to the Scottish opera soprano and movie actress, Mary Garden, who became a mentor. Garden was a single and financially independent career woman, and she advised the young ballerina on important matters: from negotiating contracts; to what to wear to formal galas; to how to respond to the numerous marriage proposals she received from male admirers.

In 1920, Ludmilla moved to New York City and danced in the Broadway musical Tip Top, starring the multi-talented Fred Stone. Opening night was at the Globe Theatre on October 5, 1920. Tip Top had mediocre success, and it closed in May 1921 after 246 performances. Almost immediately she was hired to dance in the Broadway musical Tangerine with partner Frank Holbrook. Ludmilla played the part of Arameda and danced in at least two numbers with Holbrook, including "The Sea of the Tropics" and "Dance Tangerine." In all, there were 361 performances between the August 9, 1921 opening and the final night on August 26, 1922. When Russian immigrant Adolph Bolm was hired as ballet master of the Chicago Civic Opera, he asked Ludmilla to return to Chicago as the première danseuse or prima ballerina of Chicago Opera Ballet. She was nineteen years old.

1925 - 1932
Three years later Ludmilla left Chicago and operatic ballet. She moved to Europe to further her training and career. She took classes with master teachers, including Lubov Egorova, Nicolai Legat and Margaret Craske. She danced ballet numbers in the Folies Bergère in Paris with Josephine Baker. She toured on the European ballroom circuit, dancing at famous resorts with partners trained in dance, and some who were not, such as the Frenchman and ex-boxer Georges Carpentier In 1928, Ludmilla was hired by Vaslav Nijinsky's sister, Bronislava Nijinska, as a soloist with a company founded by Ida Rubinstein, Les Ballets de Madame Rubinstein. The company, based in France, toured Europe, and at one of the performances the impresario Serge Diaghilev was in the audience. After a couple of meetings, he offered Ludmilla a contract to join Ballets Russes as a soloist, but Nijinska refused to release her from the contract. Another person to watch her perform was Anton Dolin. Once her contract with Rubinstein concluded, Ludmilla moved from France to England to dance as Dolin's partner. George Balanchine created a pas de deux for them. For a brief time Dolin and Ludmilla were engaged to marry.  Frederick Ashton picked her for the leading female role in Pomona, a piece he premiered in the inaugural production that launched the Camargo Society.  She was in the film, The Night Porter. American painter Charles Sneed Williams painted her portrait for an exhibit in London.

Ludmilla was dancing in a London revue when she caught the toe of her pointe shoe on a nail, snapping her Achilles tendon. Unable to recover the strength in her right leg required for classical ballet, and not wanting to become infamous as a one-legged ballerina, she changed the focus of her professional career to ballroom dancing. She partnered with the noted European ballroom dancer Georges Fontana and together they sailed to the United States to dance in a club in New York City. The partnership lasted no more than a few months, and Ludmilla moved to Indianapolis, Indiana. Her career as a professional dancer had ended. She was thirty years old.

1933 - 1990
On January 12, 1933, her birthday, she married a long time acquaintance, Jack "Jac" Broderick, who had studied with Oukrainsky and Pavley. The couple opened a dance studio in Indianapolis; also, Ludmilla taught with the Chicago Association of Dancing Masters. She and Jack had a son named Jan. The marriage ended. Towards the end of World War II she married Howard Gee, and when his job with an airline company took him to Peru, Ludmilla, Jan, and her mother, Isabel, moved with him. A year later the family moved to Panama and lived in the Canal Zone. They stayed for twenty-two years. In 1947, Cecilia Pinel de Remón, the wife of Panamanian president General José Antonio Remón (also known as José Antonio Remón Cantera) founded the National School of Dance, or Escuela Nacional de Danzas. Eventually, a national ballet company was established. Ludmilla headed the ballet division. Margot Fonteyn, who had married the Panamanian diplomat, Roberto Arias, sought a coach in Panama City and she chose Ludmilla. The two became close friends. Because of her friendship with Dame Fonteyn, Ludmilla was authorized to teach the Royal Academy of Dance (RAD) syllabus. She interspersed her lessons with the Enrico Cecchetti method. Cecchetti had been one of Pavlova's teachers.

When Howard retired from his civil service position the couple moved to the United States, first living in Harlingen, Texas, then in Eugene, Oregon. At age sixty-eight, the Panama government awarded Ludmilla, also known as Mrs. Jean Gee, the Order of Vasco Núñez de Balboa at a ceremony on November 15, 1971. It is the highest Panamanian award bestowed on a citizen. Ludmilla was honored for her role in establishing Panama's national ballet company. By 1972, Jean and Howard had moved to College Station, Texas, where she resumed her teaching career at a private studio. She regularly flew to New York City, or to U.S. cities such as Houston, Texas, to visit Fonteyn. Ludmilla donated her collection chronicling her dance career to the Bryan Public Library, the main library in the Bryan-College Station, Texas area. The collection included her scrapbooks of newspaper clippings; letters from close friends, such as Dolin and Ashton; playbills and programmes; and some memorabilia, including her award from the Panama government and a pair of Margot's pointe shoes. The collection was donated in memory of son Jan, who had died in 1955. He had been killed by a hitchhiker, his body dumped in a ditch near Houston, Texas. Ludmilla was still teaching at the age of eighty-seven when she died of cancer at a hospital in Houston, Texas. On April 23, 1990, Dame Margot Fonteyn attended the memorial service at St. Thomas Episcopal Church, College Station, Texas. She remained after the service concluded, taking time to speak with Ludmilla's students, many of whom were the same age as Jean when she met Pavlova.

References

Sources
 Anderson, Jack. "Chicago Was Once America's Ballet Capital." New York Times (April 1, 1984): p. H10. https://www.nytimes.com/1984/04/01/arts/dance-view-chicago-was-once-america-s-ballet-capital.html, Accessed February 1, 2017.
 American Dancer. Vol. 11, No. 5 (March 1938): p. 35. This magazine is now known as "Dance Magazine."
 Amberg, George. Ballet in America: The Emergence of An American Art. New York: Duell, Sloan and Pearce, 1949.
 Balanchine, George. Choreography by George Balanchine: A Catalogue of Works. "Pas De Deux (later called Moods), Number 95." New York: The Eakins Press Foundation, 1983.
 Barzel, Ann. The Newberry Library. Ann Barzel Rare Book Collections: 60 West Walton Street, Chicago, Illinois.
 Barzel, Ann. "Chicago's 'two Russians': Andreas Pavley and Serge Oukrainsky." Dance Magazine (June 1979): pp. 63–70 and 87-93.
 Barzel, Ann. "The First 75 Years: Dance Magazine, 75th Anniversary Issue." Dance Magazine (June 2002): pp. 31–35.
 Chicago Daily Tribune. "Dancing Her Tonic" (September 17, 1922): p. 9, ProQuest Historical Newspapers, Chicago Tribune, http://www.proquest.com, accessed November 17, 2010.
 Chicago National Association of Dance Masters, https://web.archive.org/web/20120329090219/http://cnadm.com/cnadm-history.php.
 Chicago Public Library.  www.chipublib.org
 Chicago Sunday Tribune. "A Dancer in Opera: Society and Entertainments, In the Limelight." Part 7 (January 19, 1919): p. 4.
 Christian Science Monitor. "Fred Stone in 'Tip-Top'" (September 28, 1920): p 12, ProQuest Historical Newspapers, Christian Science Monitor (1908-1997), http://www.proquest.com, accessed January 2, 2011.
 Clarke, Mary and David Vaughan, eds. The Encyclopedia of Dance & Ballet. New York: G.P. Putnam's Sons, 1977.
 Corey, Arthur. Danse Macabre: The Life and Death of Andreas Pavley. Richardson: The Havilah Press, 1977.
 Crain, Cynthia D. Interviews with Jean Marie Gee (Anna Ludmilla), 1973-1990.
 Crain, Cynthia. Eulogy. Presented at Jean Kaley Gee's memorial service on April 23, 1990, St. Thomas Episcopal Church, College Station, Texas.
 Dance Magazine. "Stage Door." Vol. 9, No. 4 (February 1928): p. 47.
 Dolin, Anton. Dolin: Friends and Memories. London: Routledge & Kegan Paul Ltd., 1982.
 Dolin, Anton. Dolin Scrapbooks Collection. National Art Library Victoria & Albert Museum. Blythe House, Theatre & Performance Collections. Reference Number: THM/11.
 Encyclopedia of Chicago. www.encyclopedia.chicagohistory.org.
 Gee Collection. Carnegie Center of Brazos Valley History, Rare Book Collections: 111 S. Main Street, Bryan, Texas. Search Anna Ludmila or Serge Oukrainsky or Andreas Pavley.
 Global Performing Arts Database. www.glopad.org.
 Haselbarth, Patty. Anna Ludmila: The Forgotten Ballerina. Ann Arbor: UMI Dissertation Services, 1999.
 INAC, Escuela Nacional de Danzas. http://200.90.132.195/inac.gob.pa/portal/index.php?option=com_content&task=view&id=32&Itemid=13.
 International Encyclopedia of Dance. Vol. 5. New York: Oxford University Press, Inc., 1998.
 Internet Broadway Database. Tip Top, http://www.ibdb.com/production.php?id=8328, accessed May 6, 2010.
 Internet Broadway Database. Tangerine, http://www.ibdb.com/production.php?id=12599, accessed May 6, 2010.
 Kane, Angela and Jane Pritchard. "The Camargo Society Part I." Dance Research: The Journal of the Society for Dance Research. Vol. 12, No. 2 (Autumn 1994): pp. 21–65.
 Kavanagh, Julie. Secret Muses: The Life of Frederick Ashton. New York: Pantheon Books, 1996.
 Litzenberger, Lesley. "Anna, Ludmila." Dance Magazine (October 1990): pp. 32–33.
 Mann, Teresa. "Panama: Music Theatre, Dance Theatre." The World Encyclopedia of Contemporary Theatre: Vol. 2, Americas. Don Rubin and Carlos Solorzano (eds.), London: Routledge, 1996, pp. 352–353, Google Books, https://books.google.com/books?id=0dt-fCGUBpkC&dq=%22Escuela+Nacional+de+Danza, accessed August 14, 2011.
 Moore, Nancy G. "Dance." Electronic Encyclopedia of Chicago. Chicago: Chicago Historical Society, The Newberry Library, 2005, p. 359, http://www.encyclopedia.chicagohistory.org/pages/359.html, accessed March 4, 2010.
 Moore, Nancy G. "Dance Training." Electronic Encyclopedia of Chicago. Chicago: Chicago Historical Society, The Newberry Library, 2005, http://www.encyclopedia.chicagohistory.org/pages/362.html , accessed March 4, 2010.
 Musical Times. "The Camargo Society." Vol. 72, No. 1062 (August 1, 1931): p. 745, JSTOR, https://www.jstor.org/stable/916193, accessed March 21, 2011.
 Newberry Library. https://mms.newberry.org/xml/xml_files/barzel.xml.
 New York Public Library for the Performing Arts.  www.nypl.org.
 New York Times. "Jean Marie Gee, 87, Dancer and Teacher." Obituary. (May 2, 1990).
 Richardson, Philip J.S. "Round the World: News of Dancers from Abroad." The Dance Magazine. Vol. 13, No. 2 (December 1929): p. 38.
 Richardson, Philip J.S. "Round the World: News of Dancers from Abroad." The Dance Magazine. Vol. 13, No. 5 (March 1930): p. 31.
 Richardson, Philip J.S. "Round the World: News of Dancers from Abroad." The Dance Magazine. Vol. 14, No. 3 (July 1930): p. 39.
 Schillo, Marion. "Ballerina's Career: A Biographical Sketch of Anna Ludmilla." The American Dancer (February 1935): pp. 9 and 28.
 Severn, Margaret. "Dancing with Bronislava Nijinska and Ida Rubinstein." Dance Chronicle. Vol. 11, No. 3 (1988): pp. 333–364, JSTOR, https://www.jstor.org/stable/1567661, accessed February 18, 2011.
 Theatre. Vol. II, No. 14 (December 10, 1886): p. 1.
 Theatre Magazine. Vol. XXVI, No. 198 (August 1917): p. 71.
 Theatre Magazine. Vol. 35, No. 12 (December 1919): p. 373.
 Theatre Magazine. Vol. 35, No. 5 (May 1922): pp. 278 and 311.
 Vaughan, David. Frederick Ashton and his Ballets. London: Dance Books, 1999.
 Walker, Kathrine Sorley. "The Camargo Society." Dance Chronicle. Vol. 18, No. 1 (1995): pp. 1–114, JSTOR, https://www.jstor.org/stable/1567830, accessed March 21, 2011.

External links

Encyclopedia of Chicago, Anna Ludmila photo
Chicago Newberry Library Ann Barzel Dance Collection
Anna dancing in ‘Intimate Revue’, photographed by Sasha, March 1930

1903 births
1990 deaths
American ballerinas
People from Chicago
20th-century American women
20th-century American ballet dancers
American expatriates in France